Yangsan Province, also known as The Sunlit Path, is a 1955 South Korean film directed by Kim Ki-young.

Plot
The film is a historical melodrama about a high government official who wants to marry a woman who is engaged to marry another man.

Cast
Kim Sam-hwa as Ok-rang 
Cho Yong-soo as Su-dong
Kim Seung-ho as Ok-rang's father
Park Am as Mu-ryeong
Go Seon-ae as Su-dong's mother
Ko Seol-bong
Lee Gi-hong
Go Il-yeon
Choe Ryong
Lee Yeong-ok

Bibliography

References

External links

1950s Korean-language films
Films directed by Kim Ki-young
South Korean romantic drama films
1955 romantic drama films
South Korean black-and-white films